Honggu is a town of Honggu District, Lanzhou, Gansu, China. Although Honggu District is named after the town, it is not the district seat. 

Located along the Huangshui River valley, most of the population lives in the fertile river plain.

The town is divided in 8 villages and one residential community: Xuanzi, Wangjiakou, Mijiatai, Xuejia, Shuichewan, Xinjian, Honggu, and Xinzhuang.

References 

Township-level divisions of Gansu